Kenmore Hills is a suburb in the City of Brisbane, Queensland, Australia.

Geography

History
Kenmore Hills originally formed part of Brookfield, but in 1969 the name was changed to Kenmore Hills, based on the neighbouring suburb of Kenmore.

In 1932 Father Robert Bartlett Bates, the rector of All Saints Anglican Church at Wickham Terrace purchased a house at 139 Brookfield Road to establish St John's Home for Aged Men, which subsequently relocated to West Toowong (where it continues to operate as St John's Residential Aged Care Home). On 12 May 1934, the Anglican Church opened St Christopher's Lodge, a home for boys. It was officially opened by James Francis Maxwell, the Member of the Queensland Legislative Assembly for Toowong. It was a farm school which operated until circa 1959. Around this timem  of the site was sold to the Presbyterian Church (now the Uniting Church in Australia) to develop an aged care centre. It was subsequently used a friary used by the Society of Saint Francis, a centre for contemplative spirituality and other community purposes. It is listed on the Brisbane Heritage Register. In 2019, the site was sold by the Anglican Church to the Uniting Church on the condition that community could continue to use the site.

The median age of the Kenmore Hills population was 44 years of age, 7 years above the Australian median. 60.5% of people living in Kenmore Hills were born in Australia, compared to the national average of 69.8%; the next most common countries of birth were England 7.5%, South Africa 4.2%, New Zealand 3%, India 2.4%, Scotland 1.3%. 81.3% of people spoke only English at home; the next most common languages were 1.9% Mandarin, 1.1% German, 1% Cantonese, 0.9% Telugu, 0.8% Afrikaans. 

Heritage listings 

 139 Brookfield Road: Old Friary Complex (also known as Brookfield Centre for Christian Spirituality)

Education 
There are no schools in Kenmore Hills. The nearest primary schools are Chapel Hill State School in neighbouring Chapel Hill to the east, Kenmore State School in neighbouring Kenmore to the south, and Brookfield State School in neighbouring Brookfield to the west. The nearest secondary school is Kenmore State High School in Kenmore.

References

External links
 
 
 

Suburbs of the City of Brisbane